Manhumirim is a Brazilian municipality located in the state of Minas Gerais. The city belongs to the mesoregion of Zona da Mata and to the microregion of Manhuaçu. The city is considered a Transit city. The Omnibus connects Manhumirim to other neighboring cities such as Alto Jequitiba, Alto Caparao, Reducto, and Manhuacu.  As of 2020, the estimated population was 22,802.

See also
 List of municipalities in Minas Gerais

References

Municipalities in Minas Gerais